Marcus I (died 211) was the bishop of Byzantium for 13 years (198–211 AD). He succeeded Bishop Olympianus. His term of office took place during the persecution of Christians by Emperor Septimius Severus. His successor was Philadelphus.

Sources
 Marcus I page on Ecumenical Patriarchate website

2nd-century Romans
3rd-century Romans
2nd-century Byzantine bishops
3rd-century Byzantine bishops
Roman-era Byzantines
Bishops of Byzantium
211 deaths
Year of birth unknown